Hot Country Songs is a chart that ranks the top-performing country music songs in the United States, published by Billboard magazine.  In 1964, 11 different singles topped the chart, published at the time under the title Hot Country Singles, in 52 issues of the magazine.  Chart placings were based on playlists submitted by country music radio stations and sales reports submitted by stores.

In the issue of Billboard dated January 4, the number one position was held by "Love's Gonna Live Here" by Buck Owens, the song's twelfth week in the top spot; the song would remain at number one through the issue dated February 1 for a total run of sixteen consecutive weeks in the top spot.  This set a new record for the longest unbroken run at number one on the Hot Country chart which would stand until 2013 when Florida Georgia Line spent a seventeenth consecutive week atop the chart with "Cruise".  Owens had three further number ones in 1964, "My Heart Skips a Beat", "Together Again" and "I Don't Care (Just as Long as You Love Me)" and spent a total of twenty weeks at number one during the year, more than twice as many as any other artist.  He was the only artist to take more than one single to number one in 1964 and twice replaced himself in the top spot when "My Heart Skips a Beat" was displaced from the top of the chart by "Together Again" before regaining the peak position two weeks later.

Two acts had the first Hot Country number ones of their respective careers in 1964.  Roger Miller spent six weeks atop the listing in July and August with his first chart-topper, the humorous song "Dang Me", and Connie Smith went to number one for the first time in November with "Once a Day", which remained in the top spot until the end of the year.  Smith's song eventually spent eight consecutive weeks at number one, a record for a female singer which stood until 2012 when Taylor Swift's "We Are Never Ever Getting Back Together" remained atop the chart for nine weeks.  In March 1964 Lefty Frizzell, one of country music's most influential vocalists, gained his final number one with "Saginaw, Michigan".  One of the biggest country stars of the early 1950s, his career had been in decline for a number of years and he had not reached the top ten since 1959, but in 1964 he returned to number one for four weeks with "Saginaw, Michigan".  Frizzell could not repeat this single's success, however; he would never again reach the top ten and alcoholism led to his death in 1975.  In August 1964 "I Guess I'm Crazy" gave Jim Reeves the first of six number ones which he achieved posthumously; the singer had been killed in a plane crash the previous month.

Chart history

See also
1964 in music
1964 in country music
List of artists who reached number one on the U.S. country chart

References

1964
Country
1964 record charts